Miguel Jerónimo de Molina y Aragonés (7 October 1638 – 31 August 1698) was a Spanish prelate who was Bishop of Malta from 1678 to 1682 when he was transferred to the Diocese of Lleida in Catalonia, Spain.

Early years
Molina was born in Fortanete, Aragón, on 7 October 1638. On 5 March 1662, he was ordained priest of the Knights Hospitallers.

Bishop of Malta
Pope Innocent XI appointed him as Bishop of Malta on 18 April 1678 and he was consecrated seven days later on 24 April by Cardinal Carlo Pio di Savoia. As Bishop of Malta, he gave a detailed review of the status of the diocese during a visit to Pope Innocent XI. Bishop Molina also called for a synod to reform the diocese. He created two new parishes in Gozo, Xewkija and Għarb.

Bishop of Lleida
On 25 May 1682, Molina was appointed Bishop of Lleida in the Principality of Catalonia, Spain. He died on 31 August 1698 at the age of 59.

References

1638 births
1698 deaths

17th-century Roman Catholic bishops in Spain
Bishops of Lleida
17th-century Roman Catholic bishops in Malta
Bishops of Malta